Cordova High School can refer to:
 Cordova High School (Alabama), Cordova, Alabama
 Cordova High School (California)
 Cordova High School (Tennessee)
 Cordova Junior/Senior High School (Cordova, Alaska)